The Congress of Racial Equality (CORE) is an African-American civil rights organization in the United States that played a pivotal role for African Americans in the civil rights movement. Founded in 1942, its stated mission is "to bring about equality for all people regardless of race, creed, sex, age, disability, sexual orientation, religion or ethnic background."

History

Founding

CORE was founded in Chicago, Illinois, in March 1942. The organization's founding members included James Leonard Farmer Jr., Anna Pauline "Pauli" Murray, George Mills Houser, Elsie Bernice Fisher and Homer A. Jack. Of the 50 original founding members, 28 were men and 22 were women, roughly one-third of them were Black and the other two-thirds white. Bayard Rustin, while not a founding member of the organization, was (as Farmer and Houser later noted) "an uncle to CORE" and provided it with significant support. The group had evolved out of the pacifist Fellowship of Reconciliation, and sought to apply the principles of nonviolence as a tactic against racial segregation. The group was inspired by Indian nationalist leader Mahatma Gandhi's support for nonviolent resistance. Indian writer and journalist Krishnalal Shridharani, who was known as a vibrant and theatrical public speaker, had been a protege of Gandhi—being jailed with him in the Salt March—and whose 1939 book War Without Violence heavily influenced the organization. During the period in which CORE was founded, Gandhi's leadership of the independence movement in India against British colonial rule was reaching its apogee; CORE sought to apply the nonviolent anti-colonial tactics pioneered by Gandhi and his followers to successfully challenge racial segregation and racism in the United States through civil disobedience.

In accordance with CORE's constitution and bylaws, in the early and mid-1960s, chapters were organized on a model similar to that of a democratic trade union, with monthly membership meetings, elected and usually unpaid officers, and numerous committees of volunteers. In the South, CORE's nonviolent direct action campaigns opposed "Jim Crow" segregation and job discrimination, and fought for voting rights. Outside the South, CORE focused on discrimination in employment and housing, and also in de facto school segregation. "Jim Crow" laws are laws that enforce racial segregation and discrimination in the United States.

Some of CORE's main leadership had strong disagreements with the Deacons for Defense and Justice over the Deacons' public threat to racist Southerners that they would use armed self-defense to protect CORE workers from racist organizations, such as the Ku Klux Klan, in Louisiana during the 1960s. Others, however, strongly supported the organization. By the mid-1960s, Farmer tried to incorporate elements of the emerging black nationalist sentiments within CORE—sentiments that, among other things, would quickly lead to an embrace of Black Power. Farmer failed to reconcile these tensions, and he resigned in 1966, but he backed his replacement, Floyd McKissick.

By 1961 CORE had 53 chapters throughout the United States. By 1963, most of the major urban centers of the Northeast, Midwest, Mid-Atlantic and West Coast had one or more CORE chapters, including a growing number of chapters on college campuses. In the South, CORE had active chapters and projects in Louisiana, Mississippi, Florida, South Carolina, and Kentucky.

Freedom Rides

On April 10, 1947, CORE sent a group of eight white (including James Peck, their publicity officer) and eight black men on what was to be a two-week Journey of Reconciliation through Virginia, North Carolina, Tennessee, and Kentucky in an effort to end segregation in interstate travel. The members of this group were arrested and jailed several times, but they received a great deal of publicity, and this marked the beginning of a long series of similar campaigns.

By the early 1960s, Farmer, who had taken a hiatus from leading the group, returned as its executive secretary and sought to repeat the 1947 journey, coining a new name for it: the Freedom Ride.

On May 4, 1961, participants journeyed to the deep South, this time including women as well as men and testing segregated bus terminals as well. The riders were met with severe violence. In Anniston, Alabama, one of the buses was fire-bombed and passengers were beaten by a white mob. White mobs also attacked Freedom Riders in Birmingham and Montgomery. The violence garnered national attention, sparking a summer of similar rides by CORE, the Student Nonviolent Coordinating Committee and other civil rights organizations and thousands of ordinary citizens.

Desegregating Chicago's schools

In the 1960s, the Chicago chapter of CORE began to challenge racial segregation in the Chicago Public Schools (CPS). By the late 1950s, the Chicago Board of Education's maintenance of the neighborhood school policy resulted in a pattern of racial segregation in the CPS. Predominantly black schools were situated in predominantly black neighborhoods on the south and west sides of the city, while predominantly white schools were located in predominantly white areas in the north, northwest and southwest sides of Chicago.

Many segregated schools were overcrowded, and in order to ease overcrowding, the Board instated double-shifts at some schools. Double-shifts meant that students in affected schools attended less than a full day of class. In another measure to alleviate overcrowding at some schools, the Board sanctioned the construction of mobile classroom units. Moreover, a significant proportion of students dropped out before finishing high school. Faculty was segregated, and many teachers in predominantly black schools lacked full-time teaching experience compared to teachers in white schools. In addition, the history curriculum did not mention African Americans. According to CORE, "school segregation [was] a damaging bacteria, a psychological handicap, which [festered] a disease generating widespread unemployment and crime in Chicago".

Between 1960 and 1963, CORE wrote letters about the conditions of schools to the Board of Education (headed by Superintendent Benjamin Willis), Mayor Richard J. Daley, the Illinois House of Representatives and the U.S. Department of Health, Education and Welfare. In addition, CORE attended the Board's school budget hearings, speaking against segregation and asking for the Board to implement transfer plans to desegregate the schools. In July 1963, CORE staged a week-long sit-in and protest at the Board office in downtown Chicago in response to the Board's inaction. Finally, Board President Claire Roddewig and Willis agreed to meet with CORE to negotiate integration, but no significant changes came to the schools.

During the mid-1960s, CORE turned towards community involvement, seeking to equip Chicagoans with ways to challenge segregation. Freedom Houses, transfer petitions, community rallies and meetings served to educate Chicagoans about segregation and provide them with tools to circumnavigate the neighborhood school policy.

By 1966, the Chicago Freedom Movement, led by Martin Luther King Jr., the Southern Christian Leadership Conference (SCLC) and Chicago's Coordinating Council of Community Organizations (CCCO), had assumed control over civil rights demonstrations and negotiations. While CORE was a member organization of the CCCO, it increasingly lost influence over desegregation efforts. And when the Chicago Freedom Movement met with representatives of the city to negotiate in the summer of 1966, they agreed on ten fair housing reforms but did not discuss reforms to desegregate the schools. While CORE played no role in the housing summit, it had shifted towards promoting and developing Black power in Chicago. By fall of 1966, CORE was no longer a civil rights organization, but a Black power organization. Changes in CORE's national leadership and continued inaction on behalf of the Board to desegregate the schools pushed CORE towards separatism and away from desegregation efforts. The chapter collapsed in October 1968.

Desegregating Durham 
In 1962, CORE set up a headquarters in Durham, North Carolina where upon arrival, local black women activists, including Sadie Sawyer Hughley, welcomed them into their homes. CORE worked with the local NAACP to organize pickets at Eckerd's Drug Store and Howard Johnson's. The goals were to increase employment opportunities for black workers and integrate local restaurants.

March on Washington

In 1963, the organization helped organize the famous March on Washington. On August 28, 1963, more than 250,000 people marched peacefully to the Lincoln Memorial to demand equal justice for all citizens under the law. At the end of the march Martin Luther King Jr. made his famous "I Have a Dream" speech.

"Freedom Summer"

The following year, CORE along with the Student Nonviolent Coordinating Committee (SNCC) and the National Association for the Advancement of Colored People (NAACP) helped organize the "Freedom Summer" campaign—aimed principally at ending the political disenfranchisement of African Americans in the Deep South. Operating under the umbrella coalition of the Council of Federated Organizations (COFO), volunteers from the three organizations concentrated their efforts in Mississippi. In 1962 only 6.7 percent of African Americans in the state were registered to vote, the lowest percentage in the country. This involved the formation of the Mississippi Freedom Democratic Party (MFDP). Over 80,000 people joined the party and 68 delegates attended the Democratic Party Convention in Atlantic City and challenged the attendance of the all-white Mississippi representation.

CORE, SNCC and COFO also established 30 Freedom Schools in towns throughout Mississippi. Volunteers taught in the schools and the curriculum now included black history, the philosophy of the civil rights movement. During the summer of 1964 over 3,000 students attended these schools and the experiment provided a model for future educational programs such as Head Start.

Freedom Schools were often targets of white mobs. So also were the homes of local African Americans involved in the campaign. That summer 30 black homes and 37 black churches were firebombed. Over 80 volunteers were beaten by white mobs or racist police officers. Three CORE activists, James Chaney, Andrew Goodman and Michael Schwerner, were murdered by the Ku Klux Klan on June 21, 1964 (see Murders of Chaney, Goodman, and Schwerner). These deaths created nationwide publicity for the campaign.

March in Cicero, Illinois
On September 4, 1966, Robert Lucas and fellow members of CORE led activists through Cicero, Illinois, to pressure the city of Chicago's white leaders into making solid commitments to open housing. Shortly before the march, Chicago city officials, including Mayor Richard J. Daley, negotiated a Fair Housing agreement with Martin Luther King Jr., James Bevel, Al Raby and others in exchange for an end of demonstrations. Nevertheless, Robert Lucas and other members of CORE felt that the march was strategically necessary and proceeded with it anyway. The march is documented in the 1966 short documentary film Cicero March, which was added to the National Film Registry in 2013.

Since 1966 

In 1966, James Farmer resigned as Director of CORE, to be replaced by Black Power advocate Floyd McKissick until 1968, when California activist Wilfred T. Ussery served a brief term as national chairman. He was replaced by Roy Innis, who was National Chairman until his death in 2017. Innis initially led the organization to strongly support black nationalism. However, subsequent political developments within the organization led it to support conservative political positions.

The FBI's "COINTELPRO" program targeted civil rights groups, including the CORE, for infiltration, discreditation and disruption. In August 1967, the FBI instructed its program "COINTELPRO" to "neutralize" what the FBI called "black nationalist hate groups" and other dissident groups.

A CORE delegation toured seven African countries in 1971. Innis met with several heads of state, including Kenya’s Jomo Kenyatta, Tanzania’s Julius Nyerere, Liberia’s William Tolbert and Uganda's Idi Amin, who was awarded a life membership of CORE. In 1973 he became the first American to attend the Organization of African Unity (OAU) as a delegate.

In 1981, to settle illegal fundraising allegations under Roy Innis, CORE paid a $35,000 fine.

CORE provides immigration services to immigrants in the preparation of petitions and applications to the United States Citizenship and Immigration Services. CORE also provides classes for immigrants in fields such as English and American Civics in its center in Nevada.

Geography 

Winning victories in northern cities in the 1940s and 1950s, CORE became active in the South with the lunch counter sit-ins of 1960. The following year CORE organized "Freedom Rides," sending black and white students south to disrupt segregated interstate bus service. Drawing much of its membership from college campuses, CORE kept up civil disobedience campaigns in the North as well as the South. They also organized activities in California, where they protested housing discrimination in San Francisco and Los Angeles, held a Western Region Conference in the Sacramento area, and launched an equal employment campaign at restaurants and stores throughout the state. In 1968, Seattle's chapter of CORE decided that, in order for it to function best in the community, it needed to be an all-black organization.

International activities 

CORE has an African branch based in Uganda, with Fiona Kobusingye as is its director. Bringing attention to the malaria crisis is one of the organization's main activities, and it has championed the use of DDT to fight the disease, and it has partnered with a variety of conservative and libertarian think tanks in this effort. In 2007, CORE organized a 300-mile walk across Uganda to promote DDT-based interventions against malaria.

Criticism 
According to an interview given by James Farmer in 1993, "CORE has no functioning chapters; it holds no conventions, no elections, no meetings, sets no policies, has no social programs and does no fund-raising. In my opinion, CORE is fraudulent."

CORE has been criticized by environmentalist groups for its efforts promoting DDT use against malaria in Africa. An article in Mother Jones magazine accused the group of selling influence, writing that, "is better known among real civil rights groups for renting out its historic name to any corporation in need of a black front person. The group has taken money from the payday-lending industry, chemical giant (and original DDT manufacturer) Monsanto, and a reported $40,000 from ExxonMobil." In his book Not A Conspiracy Theory: How Business Propaganda Hijacks Democracy, Donald Gutstein wrote that "In recent years CORE used its African-American facade to work with conservative groups to attack organizations like Greenpeace and undermine environmental regulation."

See also

 Louisiana Diary, a 1964 documentary about CORE's 1963 voting registration drive in Louisiana.
 DePorres Club, an affiliate at Creighton University in Omaha
 New York Foundation
 Steelworkers and Shipyard Workers for Equality

Notes

References
 
 
Frazier, Nishani (2017). Harambee City: Congress of Racial Equality in Cleveland and the Rise of Black Power Populism. University of Arkansas Press. .

External links

 Congress of Racial Equality Official website
Harambee City: Archival site incorporating documents, maps, audio/visual materials related to CORE's work in black power and black economic development.
 Congress of Racial Equality (CORE) Actions 1942–1970: Maps and charts showing the geography of CORE activism. From the Mapping American Social Movements project at the University of Washington.
 Timeline of Congress of Racial Equality Actions 1942–1970: A timeline of more than 600 events reported in CORE publications and The New York Times.
 Civil Rights Movement Archive
 "You Don't Have to Ride Jim Crow!" Web site for documentary of Journey of Reconciliation.
 Chris Mooney, Mother Jones, May/June 2005, "Black Gold?" - CORE, ExxonMobil
 The Frank J. Miranda Papers document Miranda's activities as CORE activist and one-time chair of the Boston CORE chapter. Located in the Archives and Special Collections of the Northeastern University Libraries in Boston, MA.
 A History of Harlem CORE
 CORE and Central Area Civil Rights Campaigns 1960-1968 , multimedia resources on CORE activity in Seattle, Washington from the Seattle Civil Rights and Labor History Project.
 CORE Documents Online collection of original CORE documents ~ Civil Rights Movement Archive.
 A History of CORE in New York City
 Congress of Racial Equality Collected Records from Swarthmore College Peace Collection

Archives
 Congress of Racial Equality, Seattle Chapter, records. 1954-2010. 5 cubic feet (12 boxes). At the Labor Archives of Washington State, University of Washington Libraries Special Collections.
 Image of three CORE hunger strikers, Jay Frank, Stanley Kohls, and Martin Goldsmith, sitting in a hallway at the Los Angeles Board of Education Building, 1963. Los Angeles Times Photographic Archive (Collection 1429). UCLA Library Special Collections, Charles E. Young Research Library, University of California, Los Angeles.

1942 establishments in Illinois
Black conservatism in the United States
African Americans' rights organizations
COINTELPRO targets
Civil rights organizations in the United States
Nonviolence organizations based in the United States
Organizations established in 1942
Anti-racist organizations in the United States